Bubblegum is the debut mixtape by Irish artist Biig Piig, released on 20 January 2023 through RCA.

Background and release
On 6 September 2022, Biig Piig released "Kerosene". The song debuted as BBC Radio 1's Hottest Record, with her describing it as a "hot girl summer anthem". She noted that it was part of a "wider project", but had not yet announced anything. On 20 October, she released a second single, "This Is What They Meant", and announced Bubblegum and its scheduled release date of 20 January 2023. "This Is What They Meant" received a music video on 17 November. The third and final single, "Picking Up", is a collaboration with Deb Never and was released on 8 December. It also received a music video, which was published on 12 January 2023.

Critical reception
Bubblegum was released to positive reception. Tara Joshi for The Guardian rated it 4/5 and called the production "immaculate". Hannah Mylrea for NME and Ben Tipple for DIY Magazine also awarded 4/5 ratings. James Mellen for Clash thought it was the most "creative, well-thought-out and simply fun" release from the United Kingdom's alternative pop scene recently and awarded it a 7/10. Jem Aswad for Variety praised the mixtape, and claimed Biig Piig's "biggest moment is yet to come".

Tracklist

References

2023 mixtape albums